Kelvin Parsons is a Canadian politician in Newfoundland and Labrador, Canada. He represented the district of Burgeo and La Poile from 1999 to 2011. Parsons served as interim party leader from August 2010 until March 2011, while Liberal leader Yvonne Jones was undergoing treatments and recovering from breast cancer.

Parsons became a member of the Newfoundland Law Society in 1980 and maintained a private practice in Port aux Basques until his election to the House of Assembly in 1999.

Parsons was first elected in 1999, in January 2000 he was named justice minister of the province. He held that position until 2003 when the liberal government was defeated. Parsons was one of only three Liberal elected in the 2007 election. In June 2011, Parsons announced that he would not seek re-election in the 2011 provincial election. His son Andrew Parsons sought the open Liberal nomination, and was elected as the district's new MHA.

References

Liberal Party of Newfoundland and Labrador MHAs
Living people
21st-century Canadian politicians
Members of the Executive Council of Newfoundland and Labrador
Year of birth missing (living people)